'Darpan Chhaya 2' (Nepali: दर्पण छायाँ २) is a 2017 Nepalese drama film with Tulsi Ghimire's direction. It is the sequel to the blockbuster Nepalese film Darpan Chaya written by Tulsi Ghimire and released in 2001. The film stars Pushpal Khadka, Sahara Karki, Shiv Shrestha and Tulsi Ghimire. The film was considered hugely inferior to its predecessor and the film was a massive disaster at the box office.

Plot 
The movie starts in the US, where Nisha is invited to a Nepalese music festival. She remembers her friends from Nepal, especially Aalap and Sargam. Aalap, a saxophonist and Sargam, a singer and dancer were in love. After a college event, their musical group is offered a gig by a music company on condition that Aalap play the saxophone. However, Aalap doesn't own his own saxophone. Sargam and her friend Keshar plan to surprise Aalap by gifting him one on his birthday. Sargam's father disapproves of Aalap's humble background. The group sign a contract with the company. On Aalap's birthday, Nisha beats Sargam and gifts Aalap a saxophone leaving Sargam heartbroken.

At his party Aalap faints as he plays the saxophone. At the hospital, Nisha collects Aalap's reports and discovers that he has a broken bone and should not play the saxophone. She realises that he suffered the damage in the accident that killed his parents and that she was responsible for. At the concert, Nisha tries her best to convince Aalap to not play the instrument. A desperate Nisha recruits Sargam's father to stop Aalap. Aalap overhears Nisha confessing her role in the accident and Aalap's condition. Conflicted if he should play, Aalap talks to Sargam and decides to go onstage determined to fulfil his dead parents' wish, but bleeds out and dies. Later, Nisha and Sargam's father find Sargam dead as well.

Cast 
 Pushpall Khadka as Aalap 
 Sahara Karki as Sargam 
 Shraddha Prasai as Nisha
 B.S. Rana as Bada
 Bharati Ghimire as Gopi's Wife
 Tulsi Ghimire as Gopi Guru
 Saroj Khanal as Sargam's father
 Shiv Shrestha as himself (cameo appearance)
 Uttam Pradhan as himself (cameo appearance)

Soundtrack 

Darpan Chhaya 2's music is directed by Nepalese musicians Ranjit Gazmer and Chandan Lomjel. The music has revived very positive feedback from Nepalese people but some people said this is for 80s and 90s people.

The music is sung by well regarded Nepalese singers Rajesh Payal Rai , Melina Rai, Ashok dhamala, Karma Gyaljen, Shiva Pariyar.

References

External links 

Nepalese romantic comedy films
Nepalese sequel films
Films directed by Tulsi Ghimire